The Harvey Girls is a novel published in 1942 by Samuel Hopkins Adams. In 1946, it was adapted by MGM into a musical film starring Judy Garland, eponymously titled The Harvey Girls.

References

1942 American novels
Western (genre) novels
American novels adapted into films
Fred Harvey Company
Novels about rail transport
Novels set on trains